The Sanford International is a PGA Tour Champions event in Sioux Falls, South Dakota, at Minnehaha Country Club, making its debut in September 2018. The tournament is sponsored by Sanford Health.

Steve Stricker won the inaugural event.

Winners

Records
Oldest winner: , Rocco Mediate, (2019)
Youngest winner: , Steve Stricker, (2018)
Most victories: 2, Steve Stricker, (2018, 2022)
Lowest score after 36 holes: 129, K.J. Choi, (63-66), (2021)
Lowest final score: 196, Miguel Ángel Jiménez, (65-66-65, 196), (2020)
Lowest final score in relation to par: −14, Miguel Ángel Jiménez, (65-66-65, 196), (2020)
Greatest victory margin: 4 strokes, Steve Stricker, (2018)
Lowest round: 62, Darren Clarke, 2nd round, (2020); Scott Parel, 3rd round, (2020)
Lowest round in relation to par: −8, Darren Clarke, 2nd round, (2020); Scott Parel, 3rd round, (2020)
Wire-to-Wire Winners: Steve Stricker in 2018 & Miguel Ángel Jiménez in 2020
Most runner-up finishes: 2, Steve Flesch, (2020 & 2021)

References

External links
Coverage on the PGA Tour Champions official site

PGA Tour Champions events
Golf in South Dakota
Sports in Sioux Falls, South Dakota
Annual sporting events in the United States
Recurring sporting events established in 2018
2018 establishments in South Dakota